Steven Pitt (March 12, 1959 – May 31, 2018) was an American forensic psychiatrist.

Family and education
Pitt was born and grew up in Southfield, Michigan. He attended Southfield-Lathrup High School and graduated from Michigan State University's College of Osteopathic Medicine. Pitt completed his General Psychiatry Residency at the University of Michigan Medical Center in Ann Arbor and completed a Forensic Psychiatric Fellowship at the University of Maryland — where he was mentored by Jonas Rappeport, the founding father of the American Academy of Psychiatry and the Law.

Career
Pitt was a professor of psychiatry at the University of Arizona College of Medicine.

In 2006 Pitt helped the police identify the Baseline killer who had raped and murdered a series of women in Phoenix, Arizona.

Pitt worked extensively on the JonBenét Ramsey case — where he was retained by both the police and prosecutor. He also worked in the investigation of the Columbine High School massacre, the Deer Creek Middle School shooting, and the Kobe Bryant sexual assault case.

Death
Pitt was murdered on May 31, 2018, by the perpetrator of the 2018 Scottsdale shootings.

References

External links
Who was forensic psychiatrist Steven Pitt? The Arizona Republic, 1 June 2018

1959 births
2018 deaths
American forensic psychiatrists
American murder victims
American osteopathic physicians
Killing of JonBenét Ramsey
People murdered in Arizona
Deaths by firearm in Arizona
University of Michigan Medical School alumni
Male murder victims
People from Southfield, Michigan